Ars Mathematica may refer to:

 Ars Mathematica (organization) - a Paris-based arts non-profit
 Ars Mathematica Contemporanea - a research journal